Friendship is a city in Crockett County, Tennessee. The population was 668 at the 2010 census. Also used to be the location of Friendship High School before it was closed for consolidation

Geography
Friendship is located at  (35.910370, -89.241827).

Demographics

As of the census of 2000, there were 608 people, 246 households, and 171 families residing in the city. The population density was 466.4 people per square mile (180.6/km2). There were 264 housing units at an average density of 202.5 per square mile (78.4/km2). The racial makeup of the city was 85.36% White, 11.68% African American, 0.33% Native American, 2.14% from other races, and 0.49% from two or more races. Hispanic or Latino of any race were 3.45% of the population.

There were 246 households, out of which 32.5% had children under the age of 18 living with them, 49.6% were married couples living together, 15.9% had a female householder with no husband present, and 30.1% were non-families. 28.0% of all households were made up of individuals, and 10.2% had someone living alone who was 65 years of age or older. The average household size was 2.47 and the average family size was 2.97.

In the city, the population was spread out, with 26.5% under the age of 18, 9.7% from 18 to 24, 27.0% from 25 to 44, 20.7% from 45 to 64, and 16.1% who were 65 years of age or older. The median age was 38 years. For every 100 females, there were 91.8 males. For every 100 females age 18 and over, there were 93.5 males.

The median income for a household in the city was $24,583, and the median income for a family was $35,909. Males had a median income of $29,375 versus $19,792 for females. The per capita income for the city was $14,641. About 16.1% of families and 23.0% of the population were below the poverty line, including 26.2% of those under age 18 and 27.5% of those age 65 or over.

Notable people
William Fones, jurist who served on the Tennessee Supreme Court, was born in Friendship

References

External links
City charter

Cities in Tennessee
Cities in Crockett County, Tennessee